Antrodia serialis is a species of polypore fungus in the genus Antrodia. Originally named Polyporus serialis by Elias Fries in 1821, it was given its current name by Marinus Anton Donk in 1966. A widespread species, A. serialis causes heart rot in living trees. In North America, it is often confused with the morphologically similar Antrodia serialiformis, which grows on oak.

References

Fungi described in 1821
Fungi of Africa
Fungi of Europe
Fungi of North America
Fungal plant pathogens and diseases
Fomitopsidaceae